Uģis Brūvelis (born June 28, 1971 in Balgale parish) is a Latvian race walker.

Achievements

References

1971 births
Living people
People from Talsi Municipality
Latvian male racewalkers
Athletes (track and field) at the 2000 Summer Olympics
Olympic athletes of Latvia